Don Penn (born 1959) is an English former professional footballer who played as a striker, making nearly 150 career appearances.

Career
Penn played for Warley County Borough, Walsall and Nuneaton Borough.

He signed for Galway Rovers in November 1977 .

Honours
with Walsall
Football League Fourth Division runner-up: 1979–80

References

1959 births
Living people
English footballers
Association football forwards
Warley County Borough F.C. players
Walsall F.C. players
Nuneaton Borough F.C. players
English Football League players
Galway United F.C. (1937–2011) players
League of Ireland players